Bayi or Chagyib District ( or ), formerly Nyingchi County, is a District of Nyingchi in the Tibet Autonomous Region, China. Bayi Town, the administrative capital of Nyingchi, is located within the district.

Geography

Bayi is located in the middle reaches of the Yarlung Tsangpo River. Both steep cliffs and flat valleys exist in the area. The average altitude is 3000 metres above sea level. "The lowest places are just around 1,000 metres above sea level."

There are many scenic places in or near Bayi.

"The Seche La Mountain Scenic Spot, in the east of Nyingchi County, is a part of the Nyainqentanglha Mountain Range, the watershed of the Nyang River and the Polung Zangbo River. The Sichuan-Tibetan Highway passes by. Standing at the mountain pass at 4,728 meters above sea level, one can admire the sunrise, sea of clouds, endless forest and the grand Namjagbarwa Peak."

Güncang township and Pelung Township by the Sichuan-Tibet Highway are home to the Moinba ethnic group.

Administrative divisions

Culture 
Lamaling Monastery is located in Puqu Township.

"The Benri La Mountain near the Dagzê Village on the western slope of the mountain is a sacred site of the Tibetan Bön Sect and one of the four great holy mountains in Tibet." It is located in the southeast of Pulha, north of the Yarlung Tsangpo River. Pilgrimages attract devotees throughout the year. "Every tenth day of the eighth month of the Tibetan calendar, a grand mountain worshiping activity is held, which is called "Nangbolhasoi," meaning "seeking for treasures from immortals." "Each year during the Sagadawa Festival the pilgrims will come to worship and circle around the holy mountain." Seven Bon temples were built around the mountain.

Climate
Bayi District has a mild subtropical highland climate (Köppen Cwb). "Under the influence of the monsoon from the Indian Ocean, the area has neither scorching summer nor freezing winter. With ample rainfall, the air is quite humid. The sunshine is long and the frost is short."

Transport 
China National Highway 318

Plans exist for the construction of a railway from Lhasa to Nyingchi. Construction work is expected to start in September 2014, and to take 6 years.

References

External links
 Linzhi County Annals

Counties of Tibet
Nyingchi